Psychinae is a subfamily of bagworm moths in the family Psychidae.

Genera
These 12 genera belong to the subfamily Psychinae:

 Anaproutia Lewin, 1949 g
 Astala Davis, 1964 c g b
 Bacotia Tutt, 1899 c g
 Basicladus Davis, 1964 c g b
 Coloneura Davis, 1964 g
 Cryptothelea Duncan, 1841 c g b
 Hyaloscotes Butler, 1881 c g
 Luffia Tutt, 1899 c g
 Peloponnesia Sieder, 1959 c g
 Prochalia Barnes & McDunnough, 1913 c g
 Proutia Tutt, 1899 c g
 Psyche Schrank, 1801 c g b

Data sources: i = ITIS, c = Catalogue of Life, g = GBIF, b = Bugguide.net

References

Further reading

External links

 

Psychidae
Moth subfamilies